Adenoa is a  monotypic genus of flowering plants belonging to Turneroideae (Passifloraceae).

Adenoa cubensis 
A. cubensis (Britton & P.Wilson) is currently, the only species assigned to Adenoa. It is a shrub native to southeast Cuba. Originally, classified as Piriqueta cubensis, it would later be reclassified as Adenoa by MM Arbo in 1977.

Floral morphology 
A. cubensis has white homostylous flowers (3cm) with protruding styles, free penduncles (1.5cm), and short pedicels (0.5cm). The stamen of A. cubensis are free, similar to those found in Piriqueta.  The anthers are obtuse. Overall, the flowers of A. cubensis are considered more complex than those found in Erblichia but simpler than those found in Turnera and Piriqueta.

In addition to the differences in flower complexity, there are differences between A. cubensis' pollen exine and the exine of other members of Turneroideae.

References

Passifloraceae
Malpighiales genera